For the membrane coated vesicle used in transport, see here.

Fagol Caspase recruitment domain-containing protein 16 is an enzyme that in humans is encoded by the CARD16 gene.

References

External links

Further reading